Get Ready is the seventh studio album by English rock band New Order. It was released on 27 August 2001 in the United Kingdom by London Records and on 16 October 2001 in the United States by Reprise Records. It was the band's first studio album in eight years, following 1993's Republic, and was their last to feature the original lineup.

Background
Peter Hook stated that the album's title "could mean anything or nothing. I thought it was just nice; New Order, Get Ready; 'cause we are, we're getting ready for the next phase of our musical lives both physically and mentally, so it's quite a simple thing but it's very pertinent."

The album was dedicated to Rob Gretton, the manager of Joy Division and New Order, who died in 1999.

Artwork
The album features cover art directed by Peter Saville and designed by Howard Wakefield, who have also designed covers for other New Order and Joy Division albums. The cover model is German actress Nicolette Krebitz.

A music video for Crystal did not feature actual members of the band but instead much younger models. This visual group was billed as "The Killers" as written on the kick drum in the video. Reportedly this inspired the band name for successful band The Killers who took that name for their own.

Reception

Get Ready received generally positive reviews from music critics. At Metacritic, which assigns a normalised rating out of 100 to reviews from mainstream publications, the album received an average score of 72, based on 24 reviews. David Browne of Entertainment Weekly opined that New Order have "never sounded stronger or more vigorous", calling Get Ready "a stunning and confident return to form". Robert Christgau of The Village Voice deemed it the band's best album "in 15 years", while AllMusic critic John Bush described the record as "their first work in 15 years that's focused on songwriting and performance rather than grafted dance techniques." In his review for Q, Andrew Harrison said that "New Order have made better records than this, but not many with such an emotional charge and the expansive noise to carry it off... [...] Get Ready is the sound of a great band breaking free of their past before your ears." 

Village Voice writer Michaelangelo Matos criticised the compositions, saying, "Calling the album Get Ready feels as if they're psyching themselves up for the task at hand—like they're raring to go but aren't exactly certain where they're going, or even necessarily why they're doing it. The songs carry this out—it's them, not the sonics, that make this the second disappointing New Order album in a row." Mojos David Peschek was unconvinced by the album, finding it to be "less a call to arms than the sound of an old man wheezing out of a creaky armchair."

By April 2006, Get Ready had sold 153,000 copies in the United States, according to Nielsen SoundScan.

Accolades
Q listed Get Ready as one of the best 50 albums of 2001. In The Village Voices 2001 Pazz & Jop poll, Get Ready was voted by critics as the year's 22nd best album.

Legacy
The track 'Slow Jam' was used to promote the latest model (at the time), Ford Falcon automobile in Australia, receiving heavy rotation on national TV.

Track listing

Notes
  signifies an additional producer

Personnel

Band Members

 Bernard Sumner - vocals, guitars
 Peter Hook - bass
 Stephen Morris - drums
 Gillian Gilbert - keyboards, synths

Credits adapted from the liner notes of Get Ready.

Additional musicians

 Pete Davis – programming 
 Simon Hale – string arrangements, conducting 
 Dawn Zee – backing vocals 
 Billy Corgan – special guest vocals 
 Bobby Gillespie – guest vocals 
 Andrew Innes – guitar

Technical

 Steve Osborne – production ; mixing 
 New Order – production 
 Bruno Ellingham – engineering ; studio assistance at Rockfield
 Andrew Robinson – engineering 
 Mark 'Spike' Stent – mixing 
 Jan 'Stan' Kybert – engineering, Pro Tools ; Pro Tools mix pre-production 
 Matt Fields – engineering assistance ; Pro Tools mix pre-production assistance 
 David Treahearn – Pro Tools mix pre-production assistance 
 Adrian Bushby – mix engineering 
 Paul 'P-dub' Walton – mix engineering 
 Flood – additional production, mix 
 Rob Kirwan – engineering 
 Owen Mulcahy – engineering assistance 
 Bernard Sumner – additional production, mix 
 Marco Migliari – studio assistance at Real World
 Tom Hannen – studio assistance at Sarm Hook End
 Tim Young – mastering at Metropolis Mastering

Artwork

 Peter Saville – cover art direction
 Jürgen Teller – photography
 Coco – thanks (cover model)
 Howard Wakefield – design
 Sam Roberts – design

Charts

Weekly charts

Year-end charts

Certifications

References

External links

2001 albums
Albums produced by Flood (producer)
Albums produced by Steve Osborne
London Records albums
New Order (band) albums
Reprise Records albums